Michal Dzubina is a Slovak professional ice hockey goaltender in Slovakia  with MHC Martin of the Slovak Extraliga.

References

External links

Living people
MHC Martin players
1983 births
Slovak ice hockey goaltenders